Alex Silva Quiroga (born 15 June 1993) is a Uruguayan professional footballer who plays as a right back and right winger for Uruguayan club C.A. Progreso in the Primera División.

References

External links
 

1993 births
Living people
Footballers from Montevideo
Uruguayan footballers
Association football forwards
Uruguayan Primera División players
Argentine Primera División players
C.A. Progreso players
Montevideo Wanderers F.C. players
Peñarol players
San Martín de San Juan footballers
Racing Club de Montevideo players
Uruguayan expatriate sportspeople in Argentina
Expatriate footballers in Argentina